Fair Game (German: Freiwild) is a 1928 German silent drama film directed by Holger-Madsen and starring Evelyn Holt, Fred Louis Lerch and Bruno Kastner. The film was adapted from the Arthur Schnitzler play.

The film's art direction was by Max Knaake.

Cast
 Evelyn Holt as Anna Riedel  
 Fred Louis Lerch as Paul Rönning  
 Bruno Kastner as Oberleutnant von Karinski  
 John Loder as Oberleutnant von Rohnstedt  
 Max Hansen as Enderle  
 Ernst Pröckl as Balduin 
 Magnus Stifter as Der Oberst  
 Hugo Werner-Kahle as Schneider  
 Jesta Berg as Zimmervermieterin  
 Gerd Briese as Leutnant Vogel  
 Günther Hadank as Dr. Wellner  
 Hilde Maroff as Pepi  
 Boris Nevolin as Kassierer Kohn  
 Friedrich Carl Perponcher as Poldi Grehlinger  
 Franz Stein as Regisseur Finke  
 Geza L. Weiss as Ein Theaterenthusiast

References

Bibliography
 Hans-Michael Bock and Tim Bergfelder. The Concise Cinegraph: An Encyclopedia of German Cinema. Berghahn Books.

External links

1928 films
Films based on works by Arthur Schnitzler
Films of the Weimar Republic
Films directed by Holger-Madsen
German silent feature films
German black-and-white films
German drama films
1928 drama films
Silent drama films
1920s German films
1920s German-language films